A fat pad (aka haversian gland) is a mass of closely packed fat cells surrounded by fibrous tissue septa. They may be extensively supplied with capillaries and nerve endings.

Examples are:
 Intraarticular fat pads.  These are also covered by a layer of synovial cells. A fat pad sign is an elevation of the anterior and posterior fat pads of the elbow joint, and suggests the presence of an occult fracture.
 Buccal fat pad can be seen in nursing babies.
 The fat pad of the labia majora, which can be used as a graft, often as a so-called "Martius labial fat pad graft", which can be used, for example, in urethrolysis.
Fat pads within the heels which when they get inflamed can cause heel pad syndrome
The pads under the balls of the feet.
The eight pairs of focal fat pads running from the armpit to the groin found in all lean women and men in a curved linear arrangement identical to the mammary ridge lines seen in human embryos.

References 

Human cells